The Central California Open National Hardcourt Championships was a men's tennis tournament played in Sacramento, California in 1971 and 1972.  The event was part of the Grand Prix tennis circuit and was played on outdoor hard courts.

Past finals

Singles

Doubles

External links
 ATP – 1971 results archive
 ATP – 1972 results archive

Grand Prix tennis circuit
Defunct tennis tournaments in the United States
Hard court tennis tournaments in the United States